The Avro 604 Antelope was a British light bomber which was designed and built in the late 1920s to meet a requirement for a light bomber to equip the Royal Air Force, competing against the Hawker Hart and the Fairey Fox II. It was unsuccessful, the Hart being preferred.

Design and development
The Avro 604 Antelope was designed to meet the requirements of Air Ministry Specification 12/26, for a single-engine light, high-speed day bomber. One prototype was ordered by the Air Ministry, which first flew in July 1928, powered by a 480 hp (360 kW) Rolls-Royce F.XIB (later known as the Kestrel) engine.

The prototype Antelope, which was a single-bay biplane with all-metal construction, was evaluated at the Aeroplane and Armament Experimental Establishment (A & AEE) at Martlesham Heath against the Hawker Hart and Fairey Fox II. While it easily met the performance requirements of the specification, it showed poor low-speed handling and spinning characteristics, and was rejected in favour of the Hart owing to the ease of maintenance of the Hart.

Operational history
After rejection for operational service, the prototype Antelope was fitted with dual controls and used by the Royal Aircraft Establishment as an engine and propeller test bed, remaining in use until September 1933.

Operators

Royal Air Force
Royal Aircraft Establishment

Specifications (Antelope)

See also

References

External links

Avro Antelope – British Aircraft Directory

1920s British bomber aircraft
Antelope
Single-engined tractor aircraft
Biplanes